The 2016 Stanley Cup playoffs of the National Hockey League (NHL) began on April 13, 2016, and ended on June 12, 2016, with the Pittsburgh Penguins defeating the San Jose Sharks four games to two in the 2016 Stanley Cup Finals.

For only the second time in league history (1970 being the only other time), none of the NHL's Canadian-based teams, seven in total, qualified for the postseason. In addition, for the second season in a row and only the fifth (and most recent) time since joining the league in 1979, all four former WHA teams (the Edmonton Oilers, Arizona Coyotes, Carolina Hurricanes and Colorado Avalanche) missed the playoffs. The Washington Capitals made the playoffs as the Presidents' Trophy winners with the most points (i.e. best record) during the regular season. This was the final season of the Detroit Red Wings' 25-season playoff appearance streak, the longest streak at the time and tied for third longest in NHL history. The Florida Panthers qualified for the playoffs for only the second time since the 1999–2000 season—both times winning their division—and fifth time in franchise history. For the fourth time in six years, all three California-based teams made the playoffs in the same season. And, for only the second time ever (1996 being the only other time), both Florida-based teams made the playoffs in the same season.

For the first time since 2006, and only the third time in league history, all Original Six teams who made the playoffs (three in total) were eliminated in the first round. The New York Islanders won their first post-season series since the 1993 Stanley Cup playoffs, ending the third longest post-season win drought in NHL history. For the seventh consecutive season and eleventh out of thirteen seasons, a team from California was in the Western Conference Final.

For the first time since 2002, no team lost in a four-game sweep in a playoff series.

Playoff seeds

This was the third year in which the top three teams in each division make the playoffs, along with two wild cards in each conference (for a total of eight playoff teams from each conference).

The following teams qualified for the playoffs:

Eastern Conference

Atlantic Division
 Florida Panthers, Atlantic Division champions – 103 points
 Tampa Bay Lightning – 97 points
 Detroit Red Wings – 93 points

Metropolitan Division
 Washington Capitals, Metropolitan Division champions, Eastern Conference regular season champions, Presidents' Trophy winners – 120 points
 Pittsburgh Penguins – 104 points
 New York Rangers – 101 points

Wild cards
 New York Islanders – 100 points
 Philadelphia Flyers – 96 points

Western Conference

Central Division
 Dallas Stars, Central Division champions, Western Conference regular season champions – 109 points
 St. Louis Blues – 107 points
 Chicago Blackhawks – 103 points

Pacific Division
 Anaheim Ducks, Pacific Division champions – 103 points
 Los Angeles Kings – 102 points
 San Jose Sharks – 98 points

Wild cards
 Nashville Predators – 96 points
 Minnesota Wild – 87 points

Playoff bracket
In each round, teams competed in a best-of-seven series following a 2–2–1–1–1 format (scores in the bracket indicate the number of games won in each best-of-seven series). The team with home ice advantage played at home for games one and two (and games five and seven, if necessary), and the other team was at home for games three and four (and game six, if necessary). The top three teams in each division made the playoffs, along with two wild cards in each conference, for a total of eight teams from each conference.

In the First Round, the lower seeded wild card in the conference played against the division winner with the best record while the other wild card played against the other division winner, and both wild cards were de facto #4 seeds. The other series matched the second and third place teams from the divisions. In the first two rounds, home ice advantage was awarded to the team with the better seed; in the last two rounds, it was awarded to the team that had the better regular season record.

Legend
 A1, A2, A3 – The first, second, and third place teams from the Atlantic Division, respectively
 M1, M2, M3 – The first, second, and third place teams from the Metropolitan Division, respectively
 C1, C2, C3 – The first, second, and third place teams from the Central Division, respectively
 P1, P2, P3 – The first, second, and third place teams from the Pacific Division, respectively
 WC – Wild Card teams

First Round

Eastern Conference First Round

(A1) Florida Panthers vs. (WC1) New York Islanders

The Florida Panthers finished first in the Atlantic Division, earning 103 points. The New York Islanders finished as the Eastern Conference's first wild-card, earning 100 points. This was the first meeting between these two teams. Florida won two of the three games of the regular season series. This was the first time that a Stanley Cup playoff series was played at the Barclays Center. The series contained the two teams with the longest playoff win drought in the league (the Islanders had not won a series since 1993, and the Panthers since 1996). The team that both clubs defeated for their last respective playoff series victory were the Pittsburgh Penguins, of which Panthers' right winger Jaromir Jagr was a member.

The Islanders defeated the Panthers in six games and won a playoff series for the first time since 1993. John Tavares scored a goal and two assists for the Islanders in a 5–4 win in game one. In game two, Roberto Luongo recorded 41 saves in a 3–1 win to help the Panthers tie the series. The Islanders came back from a two-goal deficit in the second period to win game three in overtime on Thomas Hickey's wrist shot. In game four, Jaromir Jagr had an assist to reach 200 points overall in the playoffs. The Panthers won the game 2–1. Games five and six both ended in double-overtime with identical scores of 2–1 and New York winning both games. In game five, Alan Quine scored the game-winner on a power play 16:00 into the second overtime. Thomas Greiss made 47 saves in the victory. In game six, Tavares scored the first New York goal with 54 seconds left in the third period to send the game into overtime. In the second overtime, Tavares scored his second goal and the series winner.

(A2) Tampa Bay Lightning vs. (A3) Detroit Red Wings

The Tampa Bay Lightning finished second in the Atlantic Division, earning 97 points. The Detroit Red Wings earned 93 points to finish third in the Atlantic. This was the second meeting between these teams; their only previous meeting was in last year's Eastern Conference First Round which Tampa Bay won in seven games. The teams split their four-game regular season series this year.

The Lightning defeated the Red Wings in five games. Lightning forward Nikita Kucherov scored twice and goalie Ben Bishop made 34 saves in a 3–2 win in game one. Tyler Johnson recorded two goals in game two in a 5–2 win for the Lightning. In game three, Detroit goalie Jimmy Howard was replaced with Petr Mrazek, who stopped all 16 shots in a 2–0 win. In game four, Kucherov had two goals and an assist and Jonathan Drouin assisted on all three goals scored by Tampa Bay in a 3–2 win. In the final game of the series, Alex Killorn scored with 1:43 left in the third period to give the Lightning a 1–0 lead and the series win.

Game four was the last playoff game to be held at Joe Louis Arena. The Red Wings closed the arena after the 2016–17 season.  This was further the last of 25 consecutive Detroit playoff appearances in the Stanley Cup playoffs, and is to date the most recent season in which they qualified for the playoffs.

(M1) Washington Capitals vs. (WC2) Philadelphia Flyers

The Washington Capitals earned the Presidents' Trophy as the NHL's best regular season team with 120 points. The Philadelphia Flyers finished as the Eastern Conference's second wild-card, earning 96 points. This was the fifth meeting between these teams; with both teams splitting the four previous series. They last met in the 2008 Eastern Conference Quarterfinals, which Philadelphia won in seven games. These teams split the four-game regular season series.

The Capitals defeated the Flyers in six games. Capitals goalie Braden Holtby shut out the Flyers in game one, stopping all 19 shots he faced in a 2–0 win. In game two, Holtby made 41 saves and a fluke goal by Capitals forward Jason Chimera turned to be the game-winning goal in a 4–1 win. The Capitals scored a franchise record five power play goals to rout the Flyers 6–1 in game three. In game four, Philadelphia avoided elimination by switching goaltender Steve Mason, who gave up six goals in the previous game, to Michal Neuvirth who made 31 saves in a 2–1 win. The Flyers forced a sixth game after Neuvirth made 44 saves in a 2–0 win in game five; the Flyers had 11 shots in a playoff win, the fewest ever in franchise history. Nicklas Backstrom scored the only goal for the Capitals in game six for his team to move onto the second round.

(M2) Pittsburgh Penguins vs. (M3) New York Rangers

The Pittsburgh Penguins finished second in the Metropolitan Division, earning 104 points. The New York Rangers earned 101 points in the regular season to finish third in the Metropolitan. This was the seventh meeting between these teams, and the third meeting in three consecutive seasons, with Pittsburgh losing the last two but winning four of the six overall. They last met in last year's Eastern Conference First Round, which the Rangers won in five games. Pittsburgh won three of the four games of the regular season series.

The Penguins defeated the Rangers in five games. Penguins forward Patric Hornqvist scored a hat trick in a 5–2 win in game one. J. T. Miller had three assists to help the Rangers win 4–2 in game two. In game three, Pittsburgh scored three times after New York took a 1–0 lead to win 3–1. Evgeni Malkin scored two power play goals and Matt Murray made 31 saves in game four for the Penguins in a 5–0 win. In game five, after the Penguins' four-goal second period, of which Bryan Rust had two goals and an assist, Rangers head coach Alain Vigneault pulled Henrik Lundqvist, who had given up six goals on 23 shots. The Penguins ended the series with a 6–3 victory. It was the first time the Rangers were eliminated in the opening round since 2011, snapping a five-year advancement streak. This was also the first playoff series in which two goaltenders on the same team played in and subsequently won their playoff debut, with Jeff Zatkoff winning game one and Matt Murray winning game three.

Western Conference First Round

(C1) Dallas Stars vs. (WC2) Minnesota Wild 

The Dallas Stars finished first in the Central Division, earning 109 points. The Minnesota Wild finished as the Western Conference's second wild-card, earning 87 points. This was the first meeting in the playoffs between Minnesota's current NHL franchise and its former NHL franchise (then known as the North Stars). Dallas won four of the five games of the regular season series.

The Stars defeated the Wild in six games. Jamie Benn scored a goal and two assists and goalie Kari Lehtonen made 22 saves for the Stars in game one in a 4–0 victory. Jamie Benn scored the game winner in game two in a 2–1 win for the Stars to take a 2–0 lead in the series. In game three, after Patrick Sharp scored two goals in the first period for the Stars, the Wild scored four consecutive goals to take the lead. Jason Pominville scored two of the Wild goals in a 5–3 win. Antti Niemi made 28 saves to help the Stars take a 3–1 series lead in a 3–2 win in game four. The Wild avoided elimination in game five when forward Mikko Koivu scored his second goal of the game at 4:55 of the first overtime period, in a 5–4 win. In Game six, the Stars took a four-goal lead before the Wild attempted a late comeback by scoring three goals in under five minutes during the third period. Alex Goligoski scored the eventual series-winner for Dallas halfway through the third period as the Stars hung on for a 5–4 victory.

(C2) St. Louis Blues vs. (C3) Chicago Blackhawks

The St. Louis Blues finished second in the Central Division earning 107 points. The Chicago Blackhawks earned 103 points to finish third in the Central. This was the twelfth playoff meeting between these two rivals with Chicago winning eight of the eleven previous series. Their most recent meeting was the 2014 Western Conference First Round, which Chicago won in six games. St. Louis won three of the five games of the regular season series.

The Blues defeated the Blackhawks in seven games after nearly giving up a 3–1 series lead. In game one, neither team scored in regulation; David Backes scored 9:04 into the first overtime for the Blues as goalie Brian Elliott made 35 saves in the win. In game two, Patrick Kane had two assists to help the Blackhawks win 3–2. The Blues recovered in game three, as Elliot made 44 saves in a 3–2 win. Game four saw Blackhawks goalie Corey Crawford go after Blues rookie forward Robby Fabbri after the forward was bumped into the goaltender by Chicago captain Jonathan Toews. Five penalties were assessed and the Blackhawks scored on the power play that followed. Vladimir Tarasenko scored twice for the Blues as they won the game 4–3. Blackhawks forward Andrew Shaw was given a one-game suspension and a $5,000 fine after he used a homophobic slur. In game five, the Blues overcame a 3–1 deficit in the third period to send the game to overtime. In double-overtime, Patrick Kane scored the game-winner for the Blackhawks who avoided elimination with a 4–3 win. The Blackhawks came back from a 3–1 deficit in game six, scoring five unanswered goals in a 6–3 victory to force a seventh game. In game seven, the Blues took a two-goal lead in the first period before the Blackhawks tied the game on goals by Marian Hossa and Andrew Shaw. In the third period, Troy Brouwer scored the series-winner as the Blues advanced past the opening round of the playoffs for the first time since 2012 with a 3–2 win.

(P1) Anaheim Ducks vs. (WC1) Nashville Predators

The Anaheim Ducks finished first in the Pacific Division, earning 103 points. The Nashville Predators finished as the Western Conference's first wild-card, earning 96 points. This was the second meeting between these teams in the playoffs; their only previous series was the 2011 Western Conference Quarterfinals, which Nashville won in six games. Nashville won two of the three games of the regular season series.

For the fourth straight year, the Ducks were eliminated in a seventh game at home after having a 3–2 series lead. James Neal scored 35 seconds into game one and Pekka Rinne made 27 saves for the Predators' 3–2 win. In game two, Rinne again made 27 saves in another 3–2 win to take their first ever 2–0 series lead. Before game three, Anaheim replaced goaltender John Gibson with Frederik Andersen who stopped all 27 shots he faced in a 3–0 Ducks victory. Andersen made 30 saves in a 4–1 victory in game four to tie the series. Three players for the Ducks, Ryan Getzlaf, David Perron, and Sami Vatanen, had two points in a 5–2 win in game five to stake the Ducks to a 3–2 series lead. The Predators forced their first ever seventh game after Rinne made 26 saves in a 3–1 win. In game seven, Rinne stopped 36 shots for the Predators in a 2–1 win to advance to the second round.

(P2) Los Angeles Kings vs. (P3) San Jose Sharks

The Los Angeles Kings finished second in the Pacific Division, earning 102 points. The San Jose Sharks earned 98 points to finish third in the Pacific. This was the fourth meeting between these two teams, with Los Angeles winning two of the three previous meetings. They last met in the 2014 Western Conference First Round, which Los Angeles came back from a 3–0 deficit to defeat the Sharks in seven games. San Jose won three of the five games of the regular season series.

The Sharks defeated the Kings in five games. In game one, Joe Pavelski scored twice including the game-winner to help the Sharks win 4–3. Sharks goalie, and former Kings backup goalie, Martin Jones allowed one goal on 27 shots in game two in a 2–1 win. Game three in San Jose required overtime with the game tied 1–1 after regulation time, before Tanner Pearson scored the game-winner for the Kings at 3:47 of the first overtime. In game four, all three Sharks goals came on the power play before the Kings tried to make a comeback cutting the deficit to 3–2, but that was the final score of the game. In game five, the Sharks took a 3–0 lead until the Kings scored three goals to tie the game in the second period. Early in the third period, San Jose rookie Joonas Donskoi's second goal of the game, broke the tie to give the Sharks a 4–3 lead; Joe Pavelski and Melker Karlsson provided insurance goals as the Sharks ended the series with a 6–3 victory.

Second Round

Eastern Conference Second Round

(A2) Tampa Bay Lightning vs. (WC1) New York Islanders

This was the second playoff meeting between these teams; their only previous series was in the 2004 Eastern Conference Quarterfinals, which Tampa Bay won in five games. This was the first series in the current playoff format in which a wild-card team had more points than its opponent during the regular season and did not have home ice advantage. New York won two of the three games of the regular season series.

The Lightning defeated the Islanders in five games. The Islanders took game one by a score of 5–3 with two goals scored by Shane Prince. Tyler Johnson scored two goals in a 4–1 victory for the Lightning in game two to tie the series. Games three and four both ended in overtime with Lightning victories as well as Nikita Kucherov scoring the tying goal in the third period. In game three, Kucherov scored with 39 seconds left in the third period to send it to overtime. In overtime, Brian Boyle scored the game-winner for a 5–4 win. In game four, Kucherov scored 7:49 into the third period to tie the game. Jason Garrison scored the game-winner for the Lightning 1:49 into overtime in a 2–1 win. Victor Hedman scored twice and Ben Bishop stopped all 28 shots for the Lightning in game five to move on to the Conference Finals for the second season in a row and third in six seasons.

(M1) Washington Capitals vs. (M2) Pittsburgh Penguins

This was the ninth playoff meeting between these teams, with Pittsburgh winning seven of the eight previous series. Their most recent meeting was in the 2009 Eastern Conference Semifinals, which Pittsburgh won in seven games. Pittsburgh won three of the five games of the regular season series.

The Penguins defeated the Capitals in six games. T. J. Oshie scored a hat-trick, his third goal being in overtime, in game one for the Capitals in a 4–3 win. Former Capitals forward Eric Fehr scored the game-winner in the third period for the Penguins to take game two by a score of 2–1. Matt Murray made 47 saves for the Penguins in game three for a 3–2 victory. In game four, Patric Hornqvist scored the game-winner for the Penguins in overtime as well as an assist in a 3–2 win. The Capitals avoided elimination in game five, with Braden Holtby stopping 30 of the 31 shots he faced in a 3–1 win. In game six, Pittsburgh took a 3–0 lead with two goals from Phil Kessel before the Capitals tied the game 3–3 late in the third period. In overtime, Nick Bonino scored the series-winner 6:32 into the first overtime period to send the Pittsburgh Penguins to the Eastern Conference Final.

Western Conference Second Round

(C1) Dallas Stars vs. (C2) St. Louis Blues

This was the thirteenth playoff meeting between these teams; the two teams have split the twelve previous series. They last met in the 2001 Western Conference Semifinals, which St. Louis won in a four-game sweep. St. Louis won four of the five games of the regular season series.

The Blues defeated the Stars in seven games. In game one, Radek Faksa scored with 4:44 left in the third period to give the Dallas Stars a 2–1 win. In game two, Dallas scored two goals in the third period to tie the game 3–3 after being down 3–1. In overtime, Blues' captain David Backes scored a power play goal to tie the series at a game apiece. Alexander Steen scored twice and Vladimir Tarasenko scored a goal and two assists to help the Blues rout the Stars 6–1 in game three. Jamie Benn had two assists in game four as well as the overtime-game-winner by Cody Eakin for the Stars in a 3–2 win. In game five, Paul Stastny had a goal and an assist and Brian Elliott made 27 saves in a 4–1 victory to take a 3–2 series lead. Dallas scored three goals in the first period in game six prompting St. Louis head coach Ken Hitchcock to replace Elliott who had only stopped four shots. Dallas won the game 3–2 to force a seventh game. In game seven, six different players scored a goal for the Blues in a 6–1 victory to make their first Conference Finals since 2001.

(P3) San Jose Sharks vs. (WC1) Nashville Predators

This was the third playoff meeting between these teams, with San Jose winning both previous series. They last met in the 2007 Western Conference Quarterfinals, which San Jose won in five games. Nashville won two of the three games of the regular season series.

The Sharks defeated the Predators in seven games. The home team won every game in the series. Logan Couture scored two goals in game one for the Sharks in a 5–2 win. In game two, Martin Jones made 37 saves for the Sharks in a 3–2 win. Shea Weber scored a goal and an assist and Pekka Rinne made 26 saves in a 4–1 win for the Predators in game three. The Predators played in their longest playoff game in game four going 11:12 into triple overtime. Mike Fisher scored his second goal of the game to end overtime and tie the series with a 4–3 win. Joe Pavelski scored twice for the Sharks in game five who took a 3–2 series lead with a 5–1 win. In game six, the Predators came back from an early 2–0 deficit, sending the game into overtime. In overtime, rookie Viktor Arvidsson scored the game-winner to force a seventh game in a 4–3 win. In game seven, Martin Jones stopped all 20 shots and Logan Couture scored a goal and two assists in a 5–0 win to send the Sharks onto the Western Conference Final.

Conference Finals

Eastern Conference Final

(M2) Pittsburgh Penguins vs. (A2) Tampa Bay Lightning

This was the second playoff meeting between these teams. Their only previous series was the 2011 Eastern Conference Quarterfinals, which Tampa Bay came back from a 3–1 series deficit to win in seven games. Pittsburgh last made the Conference Finals in 2013 where they were swept in four games by the Boston Bruins. This was Tampa Bay's second consecutive Conference Finals appearance; they defeated the New York Rangers in seven games in the previous year. Tampa Bay won all three games of the regular season series.

The Penguins defeated the Lightning in seven games. In game one, Lightning goaltender Ben Bishop suffered a lower-body injury in the first period, requiring him to leave the game on a stretcher. Andrei Vasilevskiy made 25 saves in relief to help the Lightning win 3–1. Four goals were scored in the first period, two by each team, in game two leaving the score tied going into overtime. Sidney Crosby scored 40 seconds into overtime for the Penguins to tie the series. Carl Hagelin and Phil Kessel both had a goal and an assist for the Penguins in a 4–2 feat in game three. The Lightning tied the series in game four in a 4–3 win with both Nikita Kucherov and Alex Killorn providing two assists each, including the game-winning goal, and the team preventing a third period comeback from the Penguins. The Penguins gave up leads of both 2–0 and 3–2 and lost in overtime when Tyler Johnson scored for the Lightning 53 seconds into the first overtime period of game five. Although Brian Boyle scored twice for the Lightning, Pittsburgh forced a seventh game after a 5–2 victory in which Crosby had a goal and an assist. In game seven, Bryan Rust scored both goals for Pittsburgh in a 2–1 victory to send the Penguins to the Stanley Cup Finals for the fifth time in franchise history.

Western Conference Final

(C2) St. Louis Blues vs. (P3) San Jose Sharks
This was the fifth playoff meeting between these teams, with both teams splitting the four previous playoff series. They last met in the 2012 Western Conference Quarterfinals, which St. Louis won in five games. St. Louis most recently made the Conference Finals in 2001, when they lost to the Colorado Avalanche in five games. San Jose last made the Conference Finals in 2011, where they lost in five games to the Vancouver Canucks. San Jose won two of the three games of the regular season series.

The Sharks defeated the Blues in six games. The Blues won game one 2–1 with help from goalie Brian Elliott who made 31 saves in the process. The Sharks bounced back in game two with Brent Burns scoring twice and goalie Martin Jones stopping all 26 shots he faced in a 4–0 win. In game three, Jones again shutout the Blues, blocking 22 shots; Tomas Hertl scored twice for the Sharks in their 3–0 victory at home. Troy Brouwer and Kyle Brodziak scored twice in a 6–3 victory for the Blues to tie the series in game four. Joe Pavelski and Joel Ward both scored twice in the Sharks' 6–3 victory in game five. The Sharks were able to advance to the Stanley Cup Finals for the first time in their 25-year history after game six with Joel Ward scoring the winning goal 3:01 into the third period in a 5–2 victory.

Stanley Cup Finals

This was the first playoff meeting between these two teams. San Jose made their first Finals appearance in their twenty-fifth season since entering the league in 1991–92. These teams split their two-game regular season series.

Player statistics

Skaters
These are the top ten skaters based on points.

Goaltenders
This is a combined table of the top five goaltenders based on goals against average and the top five goaltenders based on save percentage, with at least 420 minutes played. The table is sorted by GAA, and the criteria for inclusion are bolded.

Television
This marked the fifth postseason under NBC Sports' current 10-year contract for American television rights, and the second under Sportsnet and TVA Sports' current 12-year contract for Canadian television rights. In the United States, all playoff games were nationally televised by either NBC, NBCSN, CNBC, USA Network, and NHL Network. During the first round, these national telecasts co-existed with those of the regional rightsholders, after which NBC had exclusive rights to the remaining games. In Canada, all games were aired in English during the second postseason coverage of Rogers Media's 12-year contract of exclusive NHL rights, through its Sportsnet channel and CBC (as part of Hockey Night in Canada), and in French by TVA Sports.

With all seven of the NHL's Canadian teams out of the playoffs, media sources predicted that Rogers would take a massive decline in viewership. During the regular season, the Sunday-night Hometown Hockey games saw ratings drop 34 percent, while Hockey Night in Canada fell 18 per cent, culminating in the season closer on April 9 that attracted just 721,000 viewers. To cut production costs, Rogers only employed three full-time play-by-play crews, along with a fourth on spot duty, during the first round. In the second round, Rogers only sent a crew for games broadcast on CBC, while simulcasting NBC's feeds for all other games (which aired on Sportsnet).

Ratings were also down in the United States, with the conference finals down by 9%, and ratings for the finals down to an average of 4 million viewers, making it the third-lowest-rated finals since 2006. The decline was credited to multiple factors, including the lack of Original Six teams or teams from key media markets such as Chicago, Los Angeles, and New York, and heavy competition from the 2016 NBA Playoffs and Game of Thrones (which aired against the series-ending game 6).

References

Stanley Cup playoffs
Playoffs